James Sevier Conway (December 9, 1796 – March 3, 1855) was an American politician who served as the first governor of Arkansas from 1836 to 1840.

Early life 
James Sevier Conway was born on December 4, 1796, in Greene County, Tennessee, to Thomas and Ann ( Rector) Conway. Conway's father was born in Pittsylvania County, Virginia, in 1771. His paternal ancestors originated in Conwy, Wales. Thomas employed private tutors to teach his seven sons and three daughters. In 1818, the family moved to St. Louis, where Conway learned the art of land surveying from his uncle William Rector, surveyor-general in Illinois, Missouri, and Arkansas. In 1820, Conway resigned a Cole County, Missouri, circuit clerk's position to serve as deputy-surveyor in the newly established Arkansas Territory, where he purchased a tract of land in Hempstead (present-day Lafayette) County. While living there, Conway met Mary Jane Bradley, who had migrated with her family from Wilson County, Tennessee. They were married December 21, 1825, and had ten children, five of whom died in infancy or early childhood.

Political career 
In 1832, Conway became the surveyor-general in Arkansas Territory and served in that position until 1836. He was the elected to the new office of governor when Arkansas became a state in 1836. His administration focused on developing schools and roads. He ordered the militia to patrol the western frontier and worked to have the federal arsenal built at Little Rock. He worked to get funding for a state penitentiary. He pressed the General Assembly for establishment of a state library and university but was unsuccessful. Conway left office in 1840 and returned to Lafayette County where he served three nonconsecutive terms as postmaster.

Death and legacy 
Conway died from the complications of pneumonia on March 3, 1855. His remains were interred in the Conway Cemetery (present-day Conway Cemetery State Park), near Bradley, Arkansas. He helped establish Lafayette Academy in Greene County, Tennessee. Present-day Conway, Arkansas, is named after him.

See also 
 Conway-Johnson family
 List of Welsh Americans

References

Further reading

External links 

 Official
 Conway Cemetery State Park
 General information
 
 James Sevier Conway at National Governors Association
 James Sevier Conway at The Political Graveyard

1798 births
1855 deaths
19th-century American politicians
American people of Welsh descent
American slave owners
American surveyors
Arkansas postmasters
Burials in Arkansas
Deaths from pneumonia in Arkansas
Conway-Johnson family
Deaths in Arkansas
Democratic Party governors of Arkansas
Farmers from Arkansas
Methodists from Arkansas
People from Cole County, Missouri
People from Greene County, Tennessee
People from Lafayette County, Arkansas
People from St. Louis
Politicians from Hot Spring County, Arkansas
Politicians from Pulaski County, Arkansas